The Convention on Mutual Administrative Assistance in Tax Matters is a convention to facilitate the entering into bilateral tax information exchange agreements between state parties. The Convention was developed by the OECD and the Council of Europe and was open for signature to members of both organizations on 25 January 1988, and entered into force in 1995.

An amending protocol was concluded on 27 May 2010, which since coming into force became open to any state at the invitation of present state parties.

Ratifications
The Convention as well as the amending protocol entered into force upon the ratification of five members.

As of August 2021, one state (the United States) is a party to the original convention only, 26 states have ratified the original 1995 convention and the amending protocol, while 65 others are parties to the amended convention. The table below shows between whom the convention applies.

See also
 Tax information exchange agreements
 International taxation

References

External links
Convention text - Centre for Tax Policy and Administration
Protocol text - Protocol amending the Convention on Mutual Administrative Assistance in Tax Matters
Signatures and ratifications

Treaties entered into force in 1995
Treaties concluded in 1988
Tax treaties
OECD treaties
Council of Europe treaties
Treaties of Albania
Treaties of Argentina
Treaties of Australia
Treaties of Austria
Treaties of Azerbaijan
Treaties of Belgium
Treaties of Belize
Treaties of Cameroon
Treaties of Canada
Treaties of the People's Republic of China
Treaties of Colombia
Treaties of Costa Rica
Treaties of Croatia
Treaties of Cyprus
Treaties of the Czech Republic
Treaties of Denmark
Treaties of Estonia
Treaties of Finland
Treaties of France
Treaties of Georgia (country)
Treaties of Germany
Treaties of Ghana
Treaties of Greece
Treaties of Hungary
Treaties of Iceland
Treaties of India
Treaties of Indonesia
Treaties of Ireland
Treaties of Italy
Treaties of Japan
Treaties of South Korea
Treaties of Latvia
Treaties of Lithuania
Treaties of Luxembourg
Treaties of Malta
Treaties of Mauritius
Treaties of Mexico
Treaties of Moldova
Treaties of the Netherlands
Treaties of New Zealand
Treaties of Nigeria
Treaties of Norway
Treaties of Poland
Treaties of Portugal
Treaties of Romania
Treaties of San Marino
Treaties of Saudi Arabia
Treaties of Seychelles
Treaties of Slovakia
Treaties of Slovenia
Treaties of South Africa
Treaties of Spain
Treaties of Sweden
Treaties of Tunisia
Treaties of Ukraine
Treaties of the United Kingdom
Treaties of the United States
1988 in France
Treaties extended to Norfolk Island
Treaties extended to Christmas Island
Treaties extended to the Cocos (Keeling) Islands
Treaties extended to Ashmore and Cartier Islands
Treaties extended to Heard Island and McDonald Islands
Treaties extended to the Coral Sea Islands
Treaties extended to the Faroe Islands
Treaties extended to Greenland
Treaties extended to the Netherlands Antilles
Treaties extended to Aruba
Treaties extended to Montserrat
Treaties extended to American Samoa
Treaties extended to Baker Island
Treaties extended to Guam
Treaties extended to Howland Island
Treaties extended to Jarvis Island
Treaties extended to Johnston Atoll
Treaties extended to Midway Atoll
Treaties extended to Navassa Island
Treaties extended to the Trust Territory of the Pacific Islands
Treaties extended to Palmyra Atoll
Treaties extended to Puerto Rico
Treaties extended to the United States Virgin Islands
Treaties extended to Wake Island
Treaties extended to the Panama Canal Zone
Treaties extended to the Northern Mariana Islands
Mutual legal assistance treaties
Treaties of Andorra
Treaties of Barbados
Treaties of Monaco
Treaties of Pakistan
Treaties of Bulgaria
Treaties of Chile
Treaties of Liechtenstein
Treaties of Israel
Treaties of the Marshall Islands
Treaties of Nauru
Treaties of Saint Lucia
Treaties of Saint Kitts and Nevis
Treaties of Saint Vincent and the Grenadines
Treaties of Samoa
Treaties of Senegal
Treaties of Switzerland
Treaties of Singapore
Treaties of Uganda
Treaties of Uruguay
International taxation
Anti-tax avoidance measures